Mille Fleur may refer to:

 Mille Fleur (chicken), the common U.S. name for the Belgian Bearded d'Uccle chicken
 Mille-fleur, a background made of many small flowers and plants